André Alves dos Santos (born 15 October 1983) is a Brazilian former professional footballer who played as a striker.

Club career
In 2005 Alves joined Budapest Honvéd where he scored 6 goals in 14 appearances in six months. In summer 2005 he was transferred to Kaposvári Rákóczi. In 2 and a half seasons he played 73 times and scored 23 goals. He was loaned out to Russian side Luch-Energia Vladivostok in which he scored a goal in 13 appearances. In summer 2009 he joined Videoton FC. In the 2010–11 season he became top goalscorer. In a total, he played 91 times with Videoton FC and he scored 55 goals.

On 30 January 2012, he moved to Cyprus side Omonia. He scored his first goal at his debut in cup game against Nea Salamina.

On 30 May 2014, he signed a one-year contract with Panetolikos.

In the summer of 2015, he returned to Cyprus for AEK Larnaca.

Honours
Videoton
Monicomp Liga: 2010–11

Omonia
Cypriot Cup: 2012
Cypriot Super Cup: 2012

Individual
Monicomp Liga top goalscorer: 2010–11
HLSZ Player of the Season (Albert Flórián Award): 2010–11
Nemzeti Sport Team of the Season: 2009–10, 2010–11 Autumn Season, 2010–11
Cyta Championship top goalscorer: 2015–16

References

External links

 
 
 Player page on the official Luch-Energiya website 

1983 births
Living people
People from Dourados
Brazilian footballers
Association football forwards
Brazilian expatriate footballers
Budapest Honvéd FC players
Kaposvári Rákóczi FC players
FC Luch Vladivostok players
Fehérvár FC players
AC Omonia players
Dubai CSC players
Panetolikos F.C. players
AEK Larnaca FC players
Mezőkövesdi SE footballers
Russian Premier League players
Nemzeti Bajnokság I players
Super League Greece players
Cypriot First Division players
UAE Pro League players
Expatriate footballers in Hungary
Expatriate footballers in Russia
Expatriate footballers in Cyprus
Expatriate footballers in the United Arab Emirates
Brazilian expatriate sportspeople in Hungary
Brazilian expatriate sportspeople in Russia
Brazilian expatriate sportspeople in Cyprus
Brazilian expatriate sportspeople in the United Arab Emirates
Sportspeople from Mato Grosso do Sul